Matías Fidel Castro Fuentes (born October 24, 1987, Canelones, Uruguay) is a Uruguayan footballer currently playing for Temperley.

References

External links
 
 

1987 births
Living people
Uruguayan footballers
Uruguayan expatriate footballers
Association football goalkeepers
Argentine Primera División players
Primera Nacional players
Uruguayan Primera División players
Liverpool F.C. (Montevideo) players
Unión de Santa Fe footballers
Club Atlético Temperley footballers
Defensor Sporting players
Uruguayan expatriate sportspeople in Argentina
Expatriate footballers in Argentina